The English League was an early ice hockey league in England.  It was founded in 1931 and operated until 1936 when it disbanded, being replaced by the English National League.

A new league of the same name was founded during 1988 and continued on until 1997.

Champions
1931-32 Oxford University
1932-33 Oxford University
1933-34 Grosvenor House Canadians
1934-35 Streatham
1935-36 Birmingham Maple Leafs
1988-89 Humberside Seahawks
1989-90 Bracknell Bees
1990-91 Oxford City Stars
1991-92 Medway Bears
1992-93 Solihull Barons
1993-94 Wightlink Raiders
1994-95 Wightlink Raiders
1995-96 Wightlink Raiders
1996-97 Wightlink Raiders

References
A to Z encyclopaedia of ice hockey

See also
British ice hockey league champions

Defunct ice hockey leagues in the United Kingdom
Sports leagues established in 1931
1931 establishments in England
1936 disestablishments in England
Ice hockey leagues in England